Geelong United Basketball is a basketball association in Geelong, Victoria.

The city of Geelong and its surrounding region had two large associations fighting for resources over a 20-year period. Basketball Geelong had a strong club competition focusing on junior programs where as Corio Bay Basketball Association had a more adult orientated program focusing on social basketball competitions. Geelong United Basketball was established in 2019 as a joint partnership of Basketball Geelong and Corio Bay.

Geelong United enter teams in the Victorian Junior Basketball League, the Country Basketball League, and the Big V Youth Leagues. They also manage the Corio Bay Stingrays senior teams in the Big V and oversee the Geelong Supercats in the NBL1 South.

References

External links 
 

Big V teams
Basketball teams established in 2019
2019 establishments in Australia
Basketball teams in Victoria (Australia)
Sport in Geelong